Hiroya is a masculine Japanese given name. Notable people with the name include:

Possible Writings
博也, "command, to be (classical)"
弘也, "vast, to be (classical)"
浩哉, "wide expanse, how"
裕哉, "abundant, how"
寛也, "tolerant, to be (classical)"
寛弥, "tolerant, all the more"
大也, "large, to be (classical)"
裕也, "abundant, to be (classical)"
碩哉, "great, how"
ひろや in hiragana
ヒロヤ in katakana

People
, Japanese kickboxer
, Japanese mayor
, Japanese video game musician
, Japanese politician
, Japanese voice actor
, Japanese footballer
, Japanese politician
, Japanese actor
, Japanese footballer
, Japanese manga artist
, Japanese singer-songwriter
, Japanese ski jumper
, Japanese rower

Fictional Characters
, a character from Digimon Fusion
, a character from Fancy Lala
, a character from The Special Duty Combat Unit Shinesman
, a character from Initial D
, a character from Dive!!
, a character from Gakuen Heaven

Japanese masculine given names